Alf Rød (February 19, 1894 – December 18, 1969) was a Norwegian screenwriter, playwright, and film director. He was the brother of the actor Einar Rød.

Rød's main activity was as a screenwriter. He debuted as a screenwriter in 1926 with Baldevins bryllup, based on a play by Vilhelm Krag. Rød wrote a total of seven film scripts between 1926 and 1941. Together with Thorleif Reiss, he also wrote the play Snehvit (Snow White), which was staged at the National Theater in Oslo in 1929.

In 1936, Rød directed his first and only feature film, Dyrk jorden! In 1938, he directed the short film Bygg din framtid! (Build Your Future!), a documentary for the Norwegian Cooperative Association. Rød wrote the lyrics to the song "Fanteguttens lengsel" (The Gypsy's Yearning) for the 1932 film Fantegutten, and song lyrics for the 1950 film Marianne på sykehus.

Filmography

As screenwriter
1926: Baldevins bryllup
1927: Madame besøker Oslo
1927: Troll-elgen
1928: Bergenstoget plyndret i natt
1932: Prinsessen som ingen kunne målbinde
1936: Dyrk jorden!
1941: Kjærlighet og vennskap

As director
1936: Dyrk jorden!
1938: Bygg din framtid!

References

External links
 
 Alf Rød at Sceneweb
 Alf Rød at Filmfront
 Alf Rød at Norsk filmografi
 Alf Rød at the National Theater
 Alf Rød at the Swedish Film Database

1894 births
1969 deaths
Norwegian screenwriters
Norwegian film directors
20th-century Norwegian dramatists and playwrights
People from Halden